The lambda is the meeting point of the sagittal suture and the lambdoid suture. This is also the point of the occipital angle. It is named after the Greek letter lambda.

Structure 

The lambda is the meeting point of the sagittal suture and the lambdoid suture. It may be the exact midpoint of the lambdoid suture, but often deviates slightly from the midline. This is also the point of the occipital angle.

Development 
In the foetus, the lambda is membranous, and is called the posterior fontanelle.

Etymology 
The lambda is named after the Greek letter lambda, whose lowercase form (λ) resembles the junction formed by the sutures.

References

External links 

 

Skull